Styloptygma luteum is a species of sea snail, a marine gastropod mollusk in the family Pyramidellidae, the pyrams and their allies.

Description
The size of the shell attains 5 mm.

Distribution
This marine species occurs off New Caledonia.

References

 Souverbie, M. (1875) Descriptions d’espèces nouvelles de l’Archipel Calédonien. Journal de Conchyliologie, 23, 282–296.

External links
 To World Register of Marine Species
 

Pyramidellidae
Gastropods described in 1873